Harvey Weingarten (born June 24, 1952) is a Canadian academic. He served as president of the University of Calgary from 2001 to 2009. He was previously the provost and Vice-president Academic of McMaster University. He is a psychology and medical researcher, and alumnus of McGill University and Yale University. He was also a professor the McMaster's department of psychology and dean of the university's faculty of science. He was the first Jew to serve as President of the University of Calgary.

References

1943 births
Living people
Anglophone Quebec people
Academic staff of McMaster University
McGill University alumni
Academics from Montreal
Academic staff of the University of Calgary
Yale University alumni